Robert Winthrop may refer to:

 Robert Charles Winthrop (1809–1894), American lawyer, philanthropist and Speaker of the United States House of Representatives
 Robert Winthrop (Royal Navy officer) (1764–1832), admiral
 Robert Winthrop (banker) (1833–1892), banker and capitalist in New York City